Charles Chamois (c. 1610 – after 1684) was a 17th-century French architect from Paris.

Without being an innovator as was Louis Le Vau at the same period, Chamois remained adept at a simple but effective architecture, without superfluous ornamentation.

Biography 

Around 1630, Chamois built Nicolas Moret's house at 27  (Hôtel de Fougères), in Paris.

On 18 June 1633, Chamois rented for 6 years a small house located "rue des Orties, près des Galeries du Louvre", for "100  livres tournois of annual rent". He was then called "Architecte du Roi, bourgeois de Paris", before taking the title "architecte des bâtiments du roi" in 1640.

Around 1640-42, he worked on the house of Sieur Galland,  in Paris. In 1641, Chamois had a hotel built for Jacques Mérault at 52 , Paris.

On 18 July 1642, he concluded an estimate and masonry contract for the construction of a double main building and wing in return on a square "rue du Coulombier", belonging to Marie Ferrant, in return for 19,800 livres.

In 1645, he worked on the hotel of Gaspard de Fieubet, 20 place des Vosges. From those years on, he was a close acquaintance of André Le Nôtre.

In 1647, he could be found on the hôtel particulier of Henri de Guénégaud, rue des Francs-Bourgeois in Paris.

An act of 11 November 1650 mentions a "transport" concerning François Chamois, husband of Marguerite Poisson, an act in which Charles Chamois intervened. Was it about his parents?

In the years 1656-1657, Chamois built the Hôtel de Lauzun, on the île Saint-Louis in Paris, for Charles Gruyn des Bordes, a financier quickly enriched under Cardinal Mazarin.

In 1659, he bore the title of "engineer and architect of the king's buildings" and "councillor".

The construction of this château for one of the most important ministers of the early reign of Louis XIV can be considered a consecration of his career. For the future chancellor, he also exercised his talents for the hotel Le Tellier in Paris (at 39-45 rue des Francs-Bourgeois), still preserved.

In 1669, he worked on the Hôtel Louvois, rue de Richelieu in Paris, for Louis XIV's minister.

In 1671, he was "intendant des places frontières du royaume".

In 1674, he was finally appointed "contrôleur des fortifications des places conquises".

Main works

Civilian architecture 
 Château of Emery-en-Brie
 House of Jean Galland
 House of Marie Guichard, 7 rue Jacob (formerly rue du Colombier), 6th arrondissement of Paris
 Hôtel Mérault, 52 rue de Turenne, 3rd arrondissement of Paris
 House of Gaspard de Fieubet
 House of the Gonbault family
 House of Sanson Le Page
 House of François Roger
 House of the Monnerot brothers
 House of the Vivien family
 House at Chaville
 Château de Chaville
 Hôtel Louvois (Paris) 
 Hôtel de Lauzun (Paris)

Religious architecture 
 Filles-Bleues 
 Church of the Pères de la Merci (Paris). (Porch of the old convent preserved).
 Cistercian women of Saint-Saëns in Normandy
 Bénédictines of Ville-l'Evêque
 Nouvelles Catholiques
 Visitandines de la rue du Bac

Bibliography 
 Marie-Agnès Férault, Charles Chamois, architecte parisien du XVIIe siècle, 1981, mémoire de maîtrise soutenu à l'Université Paris IV Sorbonne.
 Marie-Agnès Férault, Charles Chamois : architecte parisien (c. 1610-after 1684), in Bulletin monumental, 1990, volume 148, No 2 Read online

References

External links 
 Charles Chamois on Structurae
 Charles Chamois on data.bnf.fr

1610s births
Year of death uncertain
Architects from Paris
17th-century French architects
French Baroque architects